Triathlon was one of the sports contested at the 2022 Commonwealth Games, held in Birmingham, England. This was the fifth staging of triathlon at the Commonwealth Games since the sport's debut in 2002, and the second staging within England specifically.

The competition took place on 29 and 31 July 2022, spread across five events (including two parasport events).

As in the last Games, the event was held over the 'sprint' format, a format that was created for venues and places that cannot fully use the Olympic distance. Therefore, this competition did not award points towards the Olympic and Paralympic classification for Paris 2024. The sprint format consisted of a event that had a shorter duration and was faster and consisted of which is the half of 'Olympic'/'Standard' distances; a 750 metre swim, a 20 kilometre bike ride and a 5 kilometre run. The mixed relay was four 'super-sprint' legs of a slightly different stages than in 2018 format: a 300 metre swim, a 5 kilometre bike leg and a 2 kilometre run.

In 2022, the paralympic class chosen for the two paratriathlon events was the visually impaired PTVI classifications,replacing the PTWC events (wheelchair at the both men's and women's events. This means all the legs will be conducted with a sighted guide which also served as the tandem pilot at the cycling leg.

Schedule
The competition schedule is as follows:

Venue
The triathlons will be held along courses that circulate through Sutton Park and Sutton Coldfield.

Qualification (parasport)

A total of 20 paratriathletes (10 per gender) nominally qualify to compete at the Games. They qualify for each event as follows:
 Paratriathletes on the World Triathlon Para Rankings.
 Recipient of a CGF / World Triathlon Bipartite Invitation.

Medal summary

Medal table

Medalists

References

External links
 Official website: 2022 Commonwealth Games – Triathlon and Para Triathlon
 Results Books – Triathlon and Para Triathlon

 
2022
Triathlon
Commonwealth Games
2022 Commonwealth Games
Parasports competitions